The Asansol–Gaya section is a railway line connecting  and Gaya in India. This  track is part of the Grand Chord, Howrah–Gaya–Delhi line and Howrah–Allahabad–Mumbai line. This section includes the NSC Bose Gomoh–Barkakana line. It is under the jurisdiction of Eastern Railway and East Central Railway.

History

Main line
The Bardhaman–Asansol line was first extended to Barakar in 1858 and then in 1894 East Indian Railway Company extended the line to Jharia and Katras, opening up the Jharia Coalfield. Dhanbad emerged as a premier coal loading area. One railway-related source says that the line from Sitarampur to Dhanbad was built in 1880.

Gurpa-Gujhandi
Once the rail link from Howrah to Delhi was completed in 1866, the East Indian Railway was making constant endeavour to reduce the distance of the Howrah–Delhi main line. After several surveys, one in 1888–89 and two more subsequently, a route was determined from Dhanbad to Mughal Sarai via Koderma and Gaya.  The major works in this section were a bridge across the Son River at Dehri, and tunnelling and ghat line construction between Gurpa and Gujhandi.

The Grand Chord was opened on 6 December 1906 by Lord Minto, then Viceroy and Governor General of India with a function at Gujahandi. The Viceroy and Lady Minto travelled to Gaya, from where they travelled in a special observation car to Gujhandi. Two special trains, running from Howrah, carried the invitees. The Viceroy screwed on a silver bolt with a silver spanner to formally complete the line.

A repeat of the historic event was organized by East Central Railway on 6 December 2006, with a special heritage train "Grand Chord ki Rani", pulled by a 1965 steam engine, carrying the guests from Gaya to Gujhandi.

Branch lines
Several years before the Grand Chord was built, a connection from the Howrah–Delhi main line to Gaya was developed in 1900 (presumably the Patna–Gaya line) and the South Bihar Railway Company (operated by EIR) had laid a line from Lakhisarai to Gaya in 1879. Track doubling of the  Kiul–Gaya section was announced in the Railway Budget for 2010–2011.

In 1907 Adra was connected to the Grand Chord at Gomoh.

The construction of the  Chandrapura–Muri–Ranchi–Hatia line started in 1957 and was completed in 1961.

In 1902, a branch line of EIR was opened from Sone East Bank (later renamed ) to Daltonganj. These lines were subsequently taken over by EIR.

Electrification
Electrification of the stretch from Netaji SC Bose Gomoh to Gaya was completed in 1961–62.

On the Gomoh–Barkakana branch line electrification was done from both ends: Gomoh to Phusro in 1986–87, Barkakana to Danea in 1996–97, Danea to Gomia and Gomia to Jarandih in 1997–98.

In 1965, Asansol–Bareilly Passenger was the first long-distance train on Eastern Railway to be hauled by an AC loco.

The Gaya–Jahanabad sector was electrified in 2002–2003. Completion of electrification of the  Patna–Gaya rail route before the end of 2003 was announced by the railway minister Nitish Kumar.

Loco sheds
Asansol is home to the oldest electric loco shed of Indian Railways. It houses WAG-5 and WAM-4 electric locomotives.

Netaji SC Bose Gomoh has an electric loco shed with capacity to hold 125+ locos. Locos housed at the shed include WAG-7, WAG-9, WAG-9I, WAP-7. WAP-7 locos serve the prestigious Howrah Rajdhani Express.

 has a diesel loco shed with WDM-2 and WDM-3A locos. It has a large yard for Bokaro Steel Plant.

Speed limits
Most of the Asansol–Gaya section is classified as ‘A’ class line where trains can run up to 160 km per hour but in certain sections speeds may be limited to 120–130 km per hour.  The Howrah Rajdhani (between Howrah and New Delhi) travels at an average speed of 85.8 km per hour and the Sealdah Rajdhani (between Sealdah and New Delhi) travels at an average speed of 84.70 km per hour.

Railway reorganisation
In 1952, Eastern Railway,  Northern Railway and North Eastern Railway were formed. Eastern Railway was formed with a portion of East Indian Railway Company, east of Mughalsarai and Bengal Nagpur Railway. Northern Railway was formed with a portion of East Indian Railway Company west of Mughalsarai, Jodhpur Railway, Bikaner Railway and Eastern Punjab Railway. North Eastern Railway was formed with Oudh and Tirhut Railway, Assam Railway and a portion of Bombay, Baroda and Central India Railway. East Central Railway was created in 1996–97.

References

External links

|

5 ft 6 in gauge railways in India

Rail transport in Jharkhand
Railway lines in Bihar
Transport in Asansol